Lena Nilsson (born 4 January 1962 in Stockholm) is a Swedish actress. Nilsson's film credits include Magnetisörens femte vinter and Videoman.  Her television credits include Kaspar i Nudådalen, Glöm inte mamma!, and Morden i Sandhamn.  She won the 2018 Guldbagge Award (Golden Scarab, Sweden's highest awards for film) for Best Actress in a Supporting Role for her performance in Videoman.

Nilsson was the mother of rapper Einár, who died after being shot in 2021.

References

External links
 

Actresses from Stockholm
20th-century Swedish actresses
1962 births
Living people